Thakur Umashankar Singh is an Indian politician and a member of 16th and 17th Legislative Assembly, Uttar Pradesh of India. He represents the Rasara constituency in Ballia district of Uttar Pradesh.

Early life and education
Umashankar Singh, born in a farmer family in Khanwar a village of Rasra, Uttar Pradesh completed his basic education in government schools and joined Satish Chand College Ballia. He started his career as a student leader and contested the student union election in SC college in the year 1991 and won the election by the highest margin ever.

Political career
Umashankar Singh contested the Uttar Pradesh Assembly Election in 2017 as a Bahujan Samaj Party candidate and defeated his close contestant Ram Iqbal Singh from Bharatiya Janata Party with a margin of 33,887 votes. 
He won the 2012 Assembly election against Sangram Singh Yadav by a large margin.

As a Social Worker
He is one of the most famous politicians of Ballia, most followed politician in U.P. Eastern region, people love him, call him garibon ka messiah. He has contributed a lot to society, in February 2016 he organized group marriages of 351 Hindu, Muslim couples which in itself is a record.

Since 1 January 2017, MLA Umashankar Singh started free 40 wi-fi hotspots for the public to use, all free of cost in Rasra, Ballia constituency.

Posts held

See also
Uttar Pradesh Legislative Assembly

References

Uttar Pradesh MLAs 2017–2022
1971 births
Living people
Uttar Pradesh MLAs 2022–2027